The 1978 Paris–Roubaix was the 76th edition of the Paris–Roubaix cycle race and was held on 16 April 1978. The race started in Compiègne and finished in Roubaix. The race was won by Francesco Moser of the Sanson team.

General classification

References

Paris–Roubaix
Paris-Roubaix
Paris-Roubaix
Paris-Roubaix
Paris-Roubaix